Catherine Hunter (born 1957 in Winnipeg, Manitoba) is a Canadian poet, novelist, editor, professor and critic.

Biography
Hunter received a BA (Hons.) from the University of Winnipeg and an MA and PhD from the University of Victoria. She is a faculty member at the University of Winnipeg where she teaches English and creative writing courses.

Her first published poems appeared in the Malahat Review in 1978. Hunter's writing has since appeared in Prairie Fire, Essays on Canadian Writing, Canadian Literature and a number of other literary periodicals.

Hunter received the McNally Robinson Manitoba Book of the Year Award for Latent Heat (1997), a collection of poetry.

She has also edited books of poetry for the Muses' Company Press.

Hunter's most recent work of fiction is the murder mystery novel Queen of Diamonds. Published by Turnstone Press imprint Ravenstone, Queen of Diamonds is a mystery thriller about fake psychics and their wealthy clientele, set in Winnipeg, Manitoba.  It was launched and became available to the public in November 2006.

Bibliography

Poetry
Necessary Crimes - 1988
Lunar Wake - 1994
Latent Heat - 1997

Novels
After Light - 2015
Where Shadows Burn - 1999
The Dead of Midnight - 2001)
The First Early Days of My Death - 2002
Queen of Diamonds - 2006

Anthologies
Before the First Word: The Poetry of Lorna Crozier - 2005 (with Lorna Crozier)

References

1957 births
Living people
Canadian women poets
Canadian women novelists
20th-century Canadian novelists
20th-century Canadian poets
21st-century Canadian novelists
21st-century Canadian poets
Writers from Winnipeg
20th-century Canadian women writers
21st-century Canadian women writers